Kruus is an Estonian and Finnish surname that may refer to:

Hans Kruus (1891–1976), Estonian historian, academic, and politician
Heino Kruus (1926–2012), Estonian basketball player
Jaan Kruus (1884–1942), Estonian military general
Tahvo Kruus (1862–1918), Finnish politician

Estonian-language surnames
Finnish-language surnames